Fangshan District is situated in the southwest of Beijing,  away from downtown Beijing. The district is divided into 8 subdistricts, 14 towns, and 6 townships.

The district administers 8 subdistricts (with 4 subdistricts under Yanshan "area"), 14 towns with 3 towns of which carry the "area" label, and 6 townships:

Geography
Other major urban areas are Liangxiang (population estimate 110,000, 93,486 in township), Zhoukoudian (35,000, 39,877 in township), Doudian (30,000, 25,046 in township), and Liulihe (22,000, 37,936 in township).

Fangshan is situated to the east of the Taihang Mountains. The east and south of the district is a fertile plain, with a narrow hilly area running from northeast to southwest. The district has many rivers and lakes; the Juma River, Dashi River, Yongding River, and Xiaoqing River run through the district, assuring abundant water resources.

The location, climate and environment provide good conditions for agriculture. The district produces wheat, rice and various high quality fruits as well as large quantities of animal products. At the moment large investments are made for greenhouse production.

Climate 

Fangshan has a humid continental climate (Köppen climate classification Dwa).

Transportation and telecommunication
Jingguang railway and Jingyuan railway cross the district. In addition, the district is serviced by 4 branch railways and 24 railway stations. Jingshi Expressway also goes through the district. The four main roads are the Jing-Zhou, Jing-Bao, Jing-Yuan, Jing-Liang roads, with branch roads to townships and villages. Tanggu Port is only  distant. The programme-controlled telephone capacity supports 128,000 phone sets.

Metro
Fangshan is currently served by two metro lines operated by Beijing Subway:

  - Daotian, Changyang, Libafang, Guangyangcheng, Liangxiang University Town North, Liangxiang University Town, Liangxiang University Town West, Liangxiangnanguan, Suzhuang, Yancun East
  - Yancun East, Zicaowu, Yancun, Xingcheng, Dashihe East, Magezhuang, Raolefu, Fangshan Chengguan, Yanshan

Suburban railway
Fangshan is also served by one suburban railway line:

  - Liangxiang

Demographic substructure

Economy
In 2017,the regional GDP of the district is 68.17 billion yuan, with GDP per capita at 59.1 thousand yuan.

Mineral resources

Fangshan has 2.1 billion tons of coal reserves, which makes it a veritable “coal storehouse” in the west of Beijing; building materials resources are also present in a variety of large deposits. Marble deposits total 450 million cubic meters. A total of 17 kinds have been developed, including “Chinese white marble”, “pink”, “rosy cloud”, and “black jade”. In particular, “Chinese white marble” is famous worldwide and is regarded as a national treasure. There are also large deposits of quartzite (29 million tons); silica (28.6 million tons), granite and buhrstone, in addition to argil, mineral water and slab stones.

Industry and agriculture

Both industry and agriculture are well developed in Fangshan. Over 2300 enterprises owned by the district, townships or villages have been set up and form a complete industrial system in a variety of trades, with different grades and many kinds of products. Yanshan Petrochemical Group, one of the largest state-owned enterprises in China, is located in Fangshan District. Agriculture has developed from traditional growing and planting to integrated and full development in forestry, livestock, greenhouse horticulture and fishery. The building industry has become the backbone of the district, with annual building area reaching 6 million square meters.

The foreign-oriented economy of Fangshan has developed rapidly in recent years. By 1999, the District government had approved 345 foreign-invested enterprises. Over 20 countries and territories throughout five continents are represented. There are 100 export-oriented enterprises producing over 40 kinds of product. Liangxiang Satellite Town, approved by Beijing Municipal Government, has become a new hub of development. In 1998, the site of Fangshan People's Government moved to Liangxiang, making it the district's center of politics, economics and culture. The development Zone of Liangxiang extends favorable policies to business. Under the Ninth Five-Year Plan and Ten-year Outline, the zone will be further opened to the outside and encourage foreign investment in the following industries: electricity, machinery and electronics, instruments, textiles, printing, new building materials, new materials, new energy resources, fine chemicals, food processing, flowers, greenhouse vegetables, tourist facilities, commercial facilities and the animal industry. The zone welcomes overseas Chinese and guests from Hong Kong, Macau, Taiwan and other countries.

Education

Tertiary:
Yanshan Practice Base of Beijing Institute of Petrochemical Technology

Monuments and parks

Fangshan district has a long history and many ancient sites. Best known is Zhoukoudian, location of the “Peking Man Site”, which has gained Fangshan the name of “Home of the Dragon”.  The 3,000-year-old ruins of the Liulihe Site are housed in the Western Zhou Yan State Capital Museum. The famous Buddhist shrine of Yunju Temple has precious Buddhist relics, including “Sakyamuni’s Bone” and 14,278 stone slabs with sculpted Buddhist sutras. There are also the remains of the Christian (Jingjiao) Monastery of the Cross from the Yuan dynasty.  There are many ancient towers, temples, town sites and other sites in Fangshan. Fangshan also has many scenic spots like Shidu’s karst landscape, the unique Stoneflower Cave and natural ancient forests in Shangfang Mountains. Ecologically, Fangshan has 554 kinds of wild plant and 22 kinds of wild animal.

Fangshan, which is part of Beijing, and neighboring Hebei, together contain Fangshan Geopark. Certified as a National Geopark, and then as a regional geopark (Asia Pacific Geopark Network), it was admitted as a UNESCO Global Geopark in 2006.

References

External links

Fangshan Information Network

 
Districts of Beijing